Juan Silvano Godoi (November 12, 1850 – January 1926) was a librarian and intellectual at the time of the Paraguayan national reconstruction.

Childhood and studies 

He was born in Asuncion on November 12, 1850. He was the son of the Colonel Juan Vicente Godoy and Petrona Echagüe. Narciso Echagüe y Andía, his mother’s father, was one of the leaders of the national independence. He was imprisoned during Francia’s dictatorship, and shot after twenty years in jail.

Juan Silvano studied in the Jesuit College of the Inmaculate Conception in the city of Santa Fe, Argentina. There, he was condisciple of José Zorrilla de San Martín. In the holydays of 1864, he spent some time in Asunción. Due to his short age and good luck, Francisco Solano López authorized him to continue his education in Argentina. This way, he escaped along with two of his brothers, the foulness of a war in which sixteen of the Echagüe family died. Some of the deceased were meritorious soldiers.

He entered the Buenos Aires School of Law, and stayed there during the whole war. In January 1869, once Asuncion was occupied, he interrupted his studies to move back to their land with a group of young fellow patriots. This was done as an attempt to help reconstruct the nation. In spite of his religious formation, Godoi had become a mason and a freethinker.

The post-war 

As a youngster Juan Silvano had begun replacing the “y” in his original surname (Godoy) for an “I”.

He was lucky enough to live through the dark postwar years in Paraguay. His strong and idealist personality forced him to get involved in the corrupt national politics. He did everything he could to help reconstruct a shattered country, but the politics scene was full of power disputes. Shortly he was known as one of the main politicians in the scene. Many politicians were killed or exiled in their attempt to establish a national order.

During the time he spent in Paraguay after his return he knew many young national leaders. He was a co-founder of the Great Club of the People (a precursor of the along with José Segundo Decoud, Facundo Machaín, Juan José Decoud, Cayo Miltos and Miguel Palacios. He witnessed how many of his previously mentioned fellows vanished.

He was elected as a conventional in the district of the Cathedral. He was a member of the commission that was in charge of redacting the Constitution of 1870. In the chaotic environment of post-war Paraguayan politics, he and his family soon found themselves opposed to powerful people.

After the killing of his brother Marcos, Juan Silvano declared himself an opponent of J. B. Gill, who had been president since 1874. Afterwards, he became a part of a conspiracy to murder of Gill. The assassination occurred in the middle of the street, April 12, 1877, and was headed by another of his brothers, Nicanor.

Exile and return 

After the murder, Godoi lived a long exile of eighteen years in Buenos Aires. His enormous cultural background and well-known education, led him to meet most of the intellectuals of Argentina, like Aristóbulo Del Valle, Ramón Cárcano, Guido Spano, Mariano Pelliza and others.
During the government of Colonel Escurra, in 1895, he returned to Paraguay. He took his library of twenty thousand volumes along with him. He also took many of his famous paintings. In addition to this he offered the country two books of his own, as a display of patriotism in spite of his long absence.

In 1901, he became general director of the National Library, Museum and Archives.
He represented Paraguay in 1910, the century of Argentina’s independence, in the America’s Congress.

His books 

He wrote many books, and was a polemic journalist. In the writings he left, there is a very valuable legacy like:

 “Monografías históricas” (1893)
 “Operaciones de Guerra del general José Eduvigis Díaz” (1897)
 “El concepto de patria” (1998)
 “El coronel Juan Antonio Escurra” (1903)
 “La muerte del Mariscal López” (1905)
 “El Barón de Río Branco” (1913)
 “El asalto a los acorazados” (1919)

Godoi died in January 1926, in Asunción. The mother of his children was Bienvenida Rivarola.

References 

 “Cien vidas paraguayas”. Carlos Zubizarreta
 “El solar guaraní”. Justo Pastor Benítez
 “Historia de las letras paraguayas”. Carlos R. Centurión
 “Historia contemporánea del Paraguay”. Gómez Freire Estéves

External links 
 List of famous paraguayans
 Museo Nacional de Bellas Artes de Asunción
 Calisphere: Juan Silvano Godoi papers (digitized documents)

1850 births
1926 deaths
People from Asunción
Paraguayan people of Spanish descent
Paraguayan non-fiction writers
Paraguayan male writers
Male non-fiction writers
Paraguayan Freemasons
University of Buenos Aires alumni